Chelan is a hamlet in the Canadian province of Saskatchewan.

Geography 
The community is on the north side of Highway 23, at the intersection of Highway 38 and Highway 773. Red Deer River is about 4km to the west and Greenwater Creek runs along the eastern edge of town.

Demographics 

See also
List of communities in Saskatchewan

References

Bjorkdale No. 426, Saskatchewan
Designated places in Saskatchewan
Organized hamlets in Saskatchewan